The Roman Catholic Diocese of Salgueiro  is a diocese located in the city of Salgueiro in the Ecclesiastical province of Olinda e Recife in Brazil.

History
 16 June 2010: Established as Diocese of Salgueiro from the Diocese of Floresta and Diocese of Petrolina

Leadership
 Bishops of Salgueiro (Roman rite)
 Bishop Magnus Henrique Lopes, O.F.M. Cap. (16 June 2010 – present)

References

 GCatholic.org

Roman Catholic dioceses in Brazil
Christian organizations established in 2010
Salgueiro, Roman Catholic Diocese of
Roman Catholic dioceses and prelatures established in the 21st century
Salgueiro
2010 establishments in Brazil